Margaret Joyce "Peggy" Wilson (born December 28, 1934) is an American professional golfer who played on the LPGA Tour.

Wilson won once on the LPGA Tour in 1968.

Professional wins (1)

LPGA Tour wins (1)

LPGA Tour playoff record (0–1)

References

American female golfers
LPGA Tour golfers
Golfers from Mississippi
Mississippi University for Women alumni
People from Lauderdale County, Mississippi
1934 births
Living people
21st-century American women